Kermit LeMoyne Staggers II (November 2, 1947 – November 28, 2019) was an American politician. He served in the South Dakota Senate from 1995 to 2002. He unsuccessfully ran for Mayor of Sioux Falls, South Dakota in 2010.

Biography
Staggers was born in Washington, Pennsylvania. He received his bachelor's and master's degree from University of Idaho. He then received his doctorate degree from Claremont Graduate University. Staggers served in the United States Air Force from 1970 to 1978 and was commissioned captain. In 1982 he moved with his wife and family and taught at the University of Sioux Falls from 1982 to 2016. He served on the Sioux Falls City Council from 2002 to 2012.

Staggers died while in hospice care in Sioux Falls on November 28, 2019, at the age of 72.

References

1947 births
2019 deaths
People from Washington, Pennsylvania
Politicians from Sioux Falls, South Dakota
Military personnel from Pennsylvania
University of Idaho alumni
Claremont Graduate University alumni
University of Sioux Falls people
South Dakota city council members
Republican Party South Dakota state senators